Carlos Alberto Teixeira Mariano, known as Mariano (born 21 November 1975) is a former Portuguese football player. 

He played 9 seasons and 183 games in the Primeira Liga for Marítimo, Varzim, Salgueiros and Penafiel.

Club career
He made his Primeira Liga debut for Salgueiros on 27 August 1995 in a game against União Leiria.

Honours
Portugal Under-18
UEFA European Under-18 Championship: 1994

References

External links
 

1975 births
Footballers from Porto
Living people
Portuguese footballers
Portugal youth international footballers
Portugal under-21 international footballers
S.C. Espinho players
Liga Portugal 2 players
S.C. Salgueiros players
Primeira Liga players
Varzim S.C. players
C.S. Marítimo players
F.C. Penafiel players
C.D. Santa Clara players
Zamora CF footballers
Portuguese expatriate footballers
Expatriate footballers in Spain
Padroense F.C. players

Association football midfielders
Association football defenders